The Bahamas competed at the 1956 Summer Olympics in Melbourne, Australia.

Medalists

Athletics

Men
Track & road events

Sailing

Open

See also
Bahamas at the 1955 Pan American Games

References
Official Olympic Reports
International Olympic Committee results database
sports-reference

Nations at the 1956 Summer Olympics
1956
Bahamas at the Summer Olympics by year
Olympics